"What's Next" is the lead single from Leaders of the New School's second album T.I.M.E. (The Inner Mind's Eye). The song peaked at number one on the Hot Rap Singles chart in 1993. The song's official music video was directed by Michael Lucero.

References

1993 singles
Elektra Records singles
Leaders of the New School songs
Music videos directed by Michael Lucero
1993 songs
Songs written by Busta Rhymes